The National Order of Merit is a civil order granted by the President of Ecuador. It was later modified by Decree No. 37 on June 28, 1937, and by Decree No. 3109 on September 26, 2002.

Degrees and distinctions
The National Order of Merit is presented by the President of the Republic at personal discretion or by the advice of the ministries. Applicants must have complied with the requirements of service or representation of the country in the civil, military, or police fields.

It has six grades:

 Grand Collar
 Grand Cross
 Grand Officer
 Commander
 Officer
 Knight

Ribbons
  The ribbon for the collar grade is completely yellow.
  The ribbon for other grades is yellow with thin blue and red stripes, one on each edge.

Selected recipients

Grand Collar
2014  José Mujica
2018  Martín Vizcarra
2018  Tamim bin Hamad Al Thani

Grand Cross
  Rafael Trujillo 
  Hugo Tolentino Dipp
2016  Luis Alberto Moreno 
2016  María Ángela Holguín 
2016  Bruno Rodríguez Parrilla 
2016  David Choquehuanca

Ecuatorians with the Grand Cross
  Víctor Mideros
1981  María Augusta Urrutia 
2004  Pavilion of the Society of Artisans of Ibarra
2004  Paolo Legnaioli
2004  Otch Von Finckenstein
2004  Mariana Yépez Andrade
2006  Luis Enrique Sarrazín Dávila
2006  Alejandro Serrano
2006  Gustavo Vega Delgado 
2007  Lautaro Pozo Malo
2015  Rodrigo Fierro 
2016  Alfredo Vera Arrata
2017  Magdalena Barreiro

Grand Officer
2006  Karl Heinz Laudenbach
2007  Magdalena Barreiro
2013  Alex Patricio Guerra Leiva
2013  Gustavo Cornejo Montalvo
2014  Fundación Fe y Alegría
2020  Debbie Muscarsel-Powel

Commander
1954  Roberto Pettinato Sr.
2005  José Ramón Euceda Ucles
2006  Jorge Núñez Sánchez
2007  David Gerardo Samaniego Torres 
2007  Carlos Ortega Maldonado

Officer
1979  Amadou-Mahtar M'Bow
2005  Verdy Rodríguez Zambrano
2005  Margarita Arosemena Gómez Lince
2006  Hebe de Bonafini
2006  Estela de Carlotto
2006  Elsa Sánchez de Oesterheld
2006  Jürgen Mertens
2006  Michael Wirtz
2006  Juan Eljuri Antón
2007  Fabián Albuja Chávez
2007  Fernando Javier Escalante Jiménez
2010  Grupo Social Fondo Ecuatoriano Populorum Progressio
2015  Teresa Zea Flor de Claero
2016  José Luis Perales
2016  Patricia González Avellán
2017  Grupo Pueblo Nuevo
2017  Father Antonio Polo
2019  Antonio Valencia

Knight
1946  Captain Eliecer Bayas Hidrobo
1989  Ing. Aerospacial Walter Valarezo Campozano
2005  Ángel Napoleón Medina Fabre
2006  Pavilion of the City of Cuenca
2006  Pierre Olivares
2007  Carlos Clemente Aguado
2007  Carlos Enrique Mejía Carrillo
2010  William W. Phillips
2010  José Tonello
2020  Sir David Attenborough

References

External links
 

1921 establishments in Ecuador
Awards established in 1921
Orders, decorations, and medals of Ecuador